Butterstick may refer to:

 Butter, a dairy product
 Tai Shan (giant panda), a giant panda nicknamed Butterstick for his size at birth

See also 
 Butterbar (disambiguation)